The false girdled lizard (Hemicordylus capensis) is a lizard species endemic to the Cape Fold Belt of southern South Africa.

Description
The maximum snout-to-vent length is about 76 mm. Like its sister species Hemicordylus nebulosus, it has gracile features, with a phenotype described as intermediate between typical Cordylus and the larger, more robust Pseudocordylus. They have long limbs, and long slender digits. Some populations are melanistic and sexually dichromatic.

Habits
Their specialized adaptation to steep rock faces is believed to have favoured their agility and lightly armored anatomy. They give live birth to one to three young.

References

 Hemicordylus resurrected: Stanley et al, 2011, Between a rock and a hard polytomy: Rapid radiation in the rupicolous girdled lizards (Squamata: Cordylidae)

Hemicordylus
Reptiles of South Africa
Reptiles described in 1838
Taxa named by Andrew Smith (zoologist)